Kultura is a rural locality (a village) in Tolbazinsky Selsoviet, Aurgazinsky District, Bashkortostan, Russia. The population was 47 as of 2010. There is 1 street.

Geography 
Kultura is located 7 km southwest of Tolbazy (the district's administrative centre) by road. Nikolsk is the nearest rural locality.

References 

Rural localities in Aurgazinsky District